Saila Kumar Mukherjee sometimes Saila Kumar Mukhopadhyay was an Indian politician. He was 2nd Speaker of the West Bengal Legislative Assembly from 20 June 1952 to 20 March 1957. He was Member of the West Bengal Legislative Assembly from Howrah East Assembly constituency in 1951 and the Howrah Uttar Assembly constituency since 1962 and 1967. He was associated with Indian National Congress.

References 

People from Howrah district
Speakers of the West Bengal Legislative Assembly
Indian politicians
West Bengal MLAs 1951–1957
West Bengal MLAs 1962–1967
West Bengal MLAs 1967–1969
West Bengal MLAs 1971–1972
Indian National Congress politicians from West Bengal